Krishna Chaitanya was the pen name of Krishnapillai Krishnankutty Nair (24 November 1918 – 5 June 1994), known as K.K. Nair. He is an author of about 40 books on the subjects of art, literature, philosophy and education, and an art critic, musicologist and photographer.

Early life and education
Nair was the eldest of three children born to P.A. Krishna Pillai, an advocate, and Gowri Thankamma, a housewife. He was born in Trivandrum and died in New Delhi. His early schooling and education was between Trivandrum and Allepy in the erstwhile state of Travancore at that time under the Madras Presidency. Chaitanya graduated from the Madras University, standing first both in B.A. and M.A. with Biology as his subject in the former and English Literature in the latter.

Career

Nair spent most of his life in Delhi where he retired as Director, Directorate of Advertising and Visual Publicity of the Government of India. Most of his works are related to the history of literature.

The major categories  of his works are: a five-volume philosophy of freedom for which he got a Jawaharlal Nehru Fellowship (1978); a ten-volume history of world literature in English and several Indian languages which won a special award from the Kerala Sahitya Academy; several books on Indology; books for children published during the International Year of the Child.

Chaitanya is the author of a four-volume history of Indian painting,
has been for three decades art critic of one Indian periodical and music and dance critic of another, has been a member of the jury for Madhya Pradesh Government's Kalidas Award for eminent musician (1985) and visual artist (1987).

As Chairman or member of functional committees he has been associated with over a dozen national cultural organizations and institutions in India. He is a recipient of the ‘Critics of ideas’ award (1964) from the Institute of International education, New York. He was honoured with a D Litt (Honoris Causa) by the Rabindra Bharati University in 1986 and received the Padma Shri from the Indian Government in 1992.

Works

Malayalam

 Samskrithahile Sahitya thathwa chintha
 Samskritha Sahithya Charithram
 Yavana Sahithya Charithram
 Roman Sahithya Charithram
 Yahooda Sahithya Charithram
 Pilkala Latheen Sahithya Charithram
 Egyptian Sahithya Charithram
 Mesopotemian Sahithya Charithram
 Purathana Greek sahithyam
 Purathana Jutha sahithyam
 Vijnanathinte moulika Thathwa thrayam
 Shasthrathinte Viswavalokanam 

English

 Sanskrit Poetics
 A new History of Sanskrit literature
 Ravi varma
 Portfolio of Indian Paintings
 The Mahabharata-a literary study
 The Gita for Modern Man
 The Betrayal of Krishna
 The biology of freedom
 The sociology of freedom
 The physics and chemistry of freedom
 The psychology of freedom
 A History of World Literature: Vol.1 Ancient Mesopotamian and Egyptian Literature (pub 1964)
 A History of World Literature: Vol.2 Ancient Greek Literature (pub 1965)
 A History of World Literature: Vol.3 Ancient Roman Literature (pub 1966)
 A History of World Literature: Vol.4 Ancient Jewish Literature (pub 1968)

References

1918 births
1994 deaths
Scholars from Kerala
Malayali people
Writers from Kerala
Indian art critics
Malayalam-language writers
Jawaharlal Nehru Fellows
Recipients of the Padma Shri in literature & education
English-language writers from India
Indian religious writers
20th-century Indian non-fiction writers
Indian social sciences writers